Burchmore is a surname. Notable people with the surname include:

Eric Burchmore (1920–1994), British Royal Air Force officer
Rhonda Burchmore (born 1960), Australian entertainer